Sparse matrix–vector multiplication (SpMV) of the form  is a widely used computational kernel existing in many scientific applications. The input matrix  is sparse. The input vector  and the output vector  are dense. In the case of a repeated  operation involving the same input matrix  but possibly changing numerical values of its elements,  can be preprocessed to reduce both the parallel and sequential run time of the SpMV kernel.

See also
 Matrix–vector multiplication
 General-purpose computing on graphics processing units#Kernels

References

Sparse matrices